The City of Matlosana (formerly City Council of Klerksdorp) is a local municipality in Dr Kenneth Kaunda District Municipality, North West Province, South Africa.

Main places
The 2001 census divided the municipality into the following main places:

Politics 

The municipal council consists of seventy-seven members elected by mixed-member proportional representation. Thirty-nine councillors are elected by first-past-the-post voting in thirty-nine wards, while the remaining thirty-eight are chosen from party lists so that the total number of party representatives is proportional to the number of votes received. In the election of 1 November 2021 the African National Congress (ANC) won a majority of forty seats in the council.
The following table shows the results of the election.

Languages
The 2011 census indicated the following prevalence of languages in this municipality:
36.0% Setswana;  
19.9% Sesotho;
17.3% Afrikaans; 
14.0% IsiXhosa;
4.3% English; 
2.1% IsiZulu;
1.2% Xitsonga ...

References

External links
 http://www.matlosana.gov.za

Local municipalities of the Dr Kenneth Kaunda District Municipality